Mighty Mukuru Wanderers Football Club  is a Malawian football club based in Blantyre. They currently play in Malawi's TNM Super League.

History

The Mighty Mukuru Wanderers FC is one of the most successful teams in the Malawi Premier Division, based in Blantyre. Mighty Mukuru Wanderers is a Malawian Club based in Blantyre, Malawi. Founded in 1962 by Portuguese immigrants. It is the oldest active club in Malawi and one of the first to play in Association football.
The founders of the club had a background of supporting FC Porto back in their home land and they adopted the Blue and White colors of Wanderers from the Portuguese giants. The clubs first official base was Portuguese club at
Chichiri in Blantyre. Rumor has it that the current club house was built after a white Portuguese girl fell in love with club legend Yasin Osman which did not please the white Portuguese, and the club house was built specifically for African players after this incident to deter future love relationships between Africans and Europeans.

They have won 6 titles in the league. In 2005 and 2006 their leading striker, Aggrey Kanyenda was the top goal scorer in the 2005–06 season.

Due to sponsorship reasons, the team was previously known as Limbe Leaf Wanderers, Telecom Wanderers, MTL Wanderers, Be Forward Wanderers.

In 2014, the club won sponsorship of about 70 million Malawi Kwacha from Be Forward, a Japanese Car Exporter.

In 2017, coached by Yasin Osman, Wanderers won their first league title in 11 years.

In January 2021, Wanderers will change its name again after the Japanese second-hand car dealers, Be Forward, concludes its sponsorship contract.

Rivalries

Blantyre Derby'

The Blantyre derby between Big Bullets and Mighty Wanderers is a fiercely contested match and in contrast to most of the other games played in the Malawi TNM Super League, matches between the two rivals always attract a large fanbase. 

Other rivals

The club also shares notable rivalry with Silver Strikers FC. Matches between these games are also a notable fixture on the Football Calendar.

Achievements
Super League of Malawi: 6
1990, 1995, 1997, 1998, 2006, 2017

Bp Top 8: 1
2004

Malawi Carlsberg Cup:1
1999

Malawi FAM Cup: 3
2005,2012, 2013

Malawi Charity Shield: 4
2004, 2006, 2016, 2019

Bingu Cup: 1
2008

Chibuku Cup: 8
 1969, 1972, 1973, 1976, 1978, 1994, 1997

Kamuzu Cup: 4'
 1976, 1982, 1985, 1997

Airtel Top 8 Cup: 1'
 2022

Press Cup: 1
 1990

'555 Challenge Cup: 3
1985, 1986, 1997

Franklin Cup: 1
 1966/67

Stan Hope Trophy: 1
 1964/65

BAT Sportsman Trophy: 2
 1985, 1986

Presidential Cup: 2
 2008/09, 2011

Performance in CAF competitions
CAF Champions League: 4 appearances
1997 – Preliminary Round
1998 – First Round
1999 – First Round
2018 – Preliminary Round

CAF Cup Winners' Cup: 1 appearance
2000 – First Round

Players

Current squad

References

External links
  BE FORWARD WANDERERS official site 
 FORWARD WANDERERS official Facebook

Football clubs in Malawi
Association football clubs established in 1962
Blantyre
1962 establishments in the Federation of Rhodesia and Nyasaland